Merete Pedersen (born 30 June 1973) is a Danish former football striker who played for Vejle BK and Odense BK in the Elitedivisionen, TSV Siegen in the German Bundesliga and Torres CF in Italy's Serie A, taking part in the UEFA Women's Cup with Odense and Torres. She was a member of the Danish national team for sixteen years, taking part in the 1999 and 2007 World Cups, the 1996 Summer Olympics and the 1997, 2001 and 2005 European Championships.

In September 2008 Pedersen scored the only goal in Denmark's 1–0 win over Ukraine to secure her country's place at UEFA Women's Euro 2009. It was her tenth goal of the qualifying series. Ahead of the final tournament she retired from international football, stating that she did not wish to sit on the substitute's bench as a 36–year–old and would prefer to concentrate on her career as a teacher. With 65 goals in 136 senior internationals she was the team's all–time top goalscorer, before her record was broken by Pernille Harder on 16 September 2021 with her 66th goal.

References

External links
 

1973 births
Living people
Danish women's footballers
Footballers at the 1996 Summer Olympics
Olympic footballers of Denmark
Denmark women's international footballers
FIFA Century Club
Odense Q players
Torres Calcio Femminile players
Serie A (women's football) players
Women's association football forwards
1999 FIFA Women's World Cup players
2007 FIFA Women's World Cup players
People from Frederikshavn Municipality
Sportspeople from the North Jutland Region